The Roman Catholic Diocese of Leiria–Fátima  is a Latin rite suffragan diocese in the ecclesiastical province of the Metropolitan Patriarchate of Lisbon.

The main church of the episcopal see is the Cathedral of Our Lady of the Conception, in Leiria. It also has two minor basilicas, both in Fátima: the Basilica of Our Lady of the Rosary and the Basilica of the Holy Trinity, and also a World Heritage Site: the Monastery of Saint Mary of the Victory, in Batalha, as a decommissioned former Cathedral (now ruined): Church of Our Lady of Pena.

History 
 May 22, 1545: Established as Diocese of Leiria, on territory split off from the Diocese of Coimbra
 In 1585 it gained territory from Metropolitan Archdiocese of Lisboa, again on 1614.10.09 
 Suppressed on September 30, 1881, its territories being reassigned (back) to Patriarchal See of Lisboa and to Diocese of Coimbra
 Restored on January 17, 1918 as Diocese of Leiria, regaining territories from Patriarchal See of Lisboa and Diocese of Coimbra
 On March 25, 1957 it gained territory from Patriarchal See of Lisboa
 Enjoyed Papal visits from Pope Paul VI in May 1967 and Pope John Paul II in May 1982, May 1991 and May 2000
 Renamed on May 13, 1984 as Diocese of Leiria–Fátima, however without a co-cathedral.
 Enjoyed Papal visits from Pope Benedict XVI in May 2010 and Pope Francis in May 2017

Statistics 
As per 2014, it pastorally served 266,792 Catholics (91.6% of 291,144 total) on 1,700 km² in 75 parishes and 6 missions with 156 priests (92 diocesan, 64 religious), 767 lay religious (77 brothers, 690 sisters) and 6 seminarians.

Bishops

Bishops of Leiria
 Brás de Barros, C.R.S.A. (1545-1556)
 Gaspar do Casal, O.E.S.A. (1557-1579)
 António Pinheiro (1579-1582)
 Pedro de Castilho (1583-1604)
 Martim Afonso Mexia (1605-1615)
 António de Santa Maria (1616-1623)
 Francisco de Menezes (1625-1627)
 Dinis de Melo e Castro (1627-1636)
 Pedro Barbosa de Eça (1636-1640)
 Pedro Vieira da Silva (1670-1676)
 Domingos de Gusmão, O.P. (1677-1678)
 José de Lencastre, O.Carm. (1681-1694)
 Álvaro de Abranches e Noronha (1694-1746)
 Joao de Nossa Senhora (1746-1760)
 Miguel de Bulhoes e Sousa (1761-1779)
 Lourenco de Lancastre (1780-1790)
 Manuel de Aguiar (1790-1815)
 Joao Inacio de Fonseca Manso (1818-1834)
 Guilherme Henriques de Carvalho (1943-1845)
 Manuel José da Costa (1846-1851)
 Joaquim Ferreira Ferraz (1852-1873)
 José Alves Correia da Silva (1920-1957)
 João Pereira Venâncio, O.R.C. (1958-1972)
 Alberto Cosme do Amaral (1972-1984)

Bishops of Leiria-Fatima
 Alberto Cosme do Amaral (13 May 1984 –  2 February 1993)
 Serafim de Sousa Ferreira e Silva (2 February 1993 – 22 April 2006)
 António Augusto dos Santos Marto (22 April 2006 – 28 January 2022)
 José Ornelas Carvalho, S.C.I. (28 January 2022 – present)

See also
 List of Catholic dioceses in Portugal
 Basilica of Our Lady of the Rosary (Fátima)
 Basilica of the Holy Trinity (Fátima)
 Our Lady of Fátima
 Sanctuary of Fátima

Notes

Sources and external links 
 Diocese of Leiria-Fátima – Official website
 GCatholic, with Google map - data for alls sections

Roman Catholic dioceses in Portugal
Roman Catholic Ecclesiastical Province of Lisbon